George Joseph Bromilow (4 December 1931 – 19 December 2005) was an English amateur footballer who represented Great Britain at the 1956 Summer Olympics. During the tournament, Bromilow scored two goals in two games.

Bromilow, who played as an inside forward, made 84 appearances in the Football League for Southport between 1955 and 1959, scoring 37 goals. Bromilow also played non-league football with Northern Nomads and Bishop Auckland.

References

1931 births
2005 deaths
English footballers
Southport F.C. players
Bishop Auckland F.C. players
English Football League players
Footballers at the 1956 Summer Olympics
Olympic footballers of Great Britain
Northern Nomads F.C. players
Association football inside forwards